Mago Digo Dai (Sinhala: මගෝ ඩිගො ඩයි) is a 2010 Sri Lankan Sinhala comedy film directed by Srilal Priyadeva and produced by Janitha Marasinghe. It stars Vijaya Nandasiri, singer Gamini Susiriwardana and Anarkali Akarsha in lead roles along with Sanath Gunathilake and Anton Jude. Music composed by Neil Warnakulasuriya. It is the 1137th Sri Lankan film in the Sinhala cinema.

Plot
The movie revolves around two detectives Perera and Ari (Vijaya and Gamini), who started to find crimes and other illegal businesses and incidents they had to take part in funny ways, in the meanwhile they search about a missing girl of a minister.

Cast
 Vijaya Nandasiri as Sergeant C. K. Perera / Mago
 Gamini Susiriwardana as Constable I. O. Ari / Digo
 Sanath Gunathilake as Minister Sathyapala
 Anarkali Akarsha as Rosy
 Anton Jude as Sudu Mathathaya
 Sarath Chandrasiri as Kuhakawathe Chandare
 Teddy Vidyalankara as Digajanthu
 Sunil Hettiarachchi as Premaratne aka Adara Rathne
 Upali Keerthisena as Chinthaka Master
 Sarath Dikkumbura
 Dilshani Perera as Kareena
 Saman Almeida as Pieris
 Eardley Wedamuni as Wijesinghe
 Ronnie Leitch as Dhanawansa
 D.B. Gangodathenna as Mudiyanse
 Wasala Senarath as Malith
 Shashiranga Wickramasekara as Amila
 Roshini Gamage as Champa
 The Dog Sheeba as Dai

Music

References

External links
 Win with ‘Magodi Godai

2010 films
2010s Sinhala-language films